Henry Villar (born May 24, 1987 in Bonao, Dominican Republic) is a right-handed former Major League Baseball pitcher.

Villar began his professional career in 2006 with the Dominican Summer Astros, going 1-1 with a 2.16 ERA in 13 games (seven starts). He spent 2007 with the DSL Astros as well, going 4-4 with a 2.45 ERA in 13 starts. In 2008, he pitched for the Greeneville Astros, going 3-6 with a 4.41 ERA in 13 starts. With the Lexington Legends in 2009, he was used primarily as a relief pitcher, going 3-4 with a 2.60 ERA in 43 games (three starts).

Villar made his major league debut with the Astros on September 10, 2010. He made eight appearances for the Astros in 2010, all as a relief pitcher.

References

1987 births
Living people
Corpus Christi Hooks players
Dominican Republic expatriate baseball players in the United States
Greeneville Astros players
Houston Astros players

Lexington Legends players
Major League Baseball pitchers
Major League Baseball players from the Dominican Republic
People from Bonao
Oklahoma City RedHawks players